Dante is a census-designated place in Russell and Dickenson counties, Virginia, in the United States. The population as of the 2010 Census was 649.

History

Dante (rhymed with "paint", sometimes rhymed with "pant", but never rhymed with "Dante Alighieri") was originally called "Turkeyfoot" due to the confluence of hollows. It was originally settled in the late 1700s and early 1800s by western frontiersmen. 

Explosive growth occurred in the early 1900s with the discovery and exploitation of numerous bituminous coal seams. Southern industrialist George L. Carter made it the northern terminus of the Clinchfield Railroad and the headquarters of the Clinchfield Coal Company, which began to mine the nearby hollows (mainly Bear Wallow and Straight Hollow) during the early part of the 20th century. As a result, immigrants from Germany, Hungary, Greece, Poland and other central European countries flocked to the area. In 1912, the construction of the Sandy Ridge Tunnel just north of Dante allowed the Clinchfield Railroad to extend all the way to Elkhorn City, Kentucky. The coal seams surrounding the community were largely exhausted by the mid-1960s and were closed in favor of new mines such as Moss #3 (A, B, C and D mines) in Duty, Virginia. 

Dante was mostly a decaying coal town until 2016, when a renewed interest from its residents prompted community organizations to begin discussions on a path to revitalization. This plan has included reestablishment of a general store and redevelopment of the many abandoned Clinchfield Railroad grades and mine tramways into ATV trails. CSX Transportation terminated rail crew operations at Dante Yard in 2015, and the Clinchfield Coal Company offices are now apartments.

Revitalization 
In early 2016 the Dante Community Association was formed with citizens of Dante and representatives from Russell County. The goal of the organization is to promote the revitalization of Dante and the surrounding area by investing in infrastructure, economic development, and the community at large, they are currently in the process of applying for a planning grant.

Geography
Dante is located in northwestern Russell County. The Dante CDP extends west into Dickenson County to include the settlement of West Dante. The communities are located in the valley of Lick Creek, which flows south to the Clinch River at St. Paul, and is thus part of the Tennessee River watershed. Sandy Ridge, overlooking Dante to the north, lies along the Tennessee Valley Divide, with waters on the opposite side flowing north via the McClure River to the Russell Fork/Levisa Fork/Big Sandy River system, reaching the Ohio River near Huntington, West Virginia.

Climate
The climate in this area is characterized by hot, humid summers and generally mild to cool winters.  According to the Köppen Climate Classification system, Dante has a humid subtropical climate, abbreviated "Cfa" on climate maps.

References

External links

 West Dante WPA Sewing Project

Census-designated places in Russell County, Virginia
Census-designated places in Dickenson County, Virginia
Census-designated places in Virginia
Coal towns in Virginia